Eliot Stannard (1 March 1888 – 21 November 1944) was an English screenwriter and director. He was the son of civil engineer Arthur Stannard and Yorkshire-born novelist Henrietta Eliza Vaughan Palmer. Stannard wrote the screenplay for more than 80 films between 1914 and 1933, including eight films directed by Alfred Hitchcock. He also directed five films. During the early 1920s, he worked on most of the screenplays for the Ideal Film Company, one of Britain's leading silent film studios.

Partial filmography

 The Idol of Paris (1914)
 Florence Nightingale (1915)
 The Mystery of a Hansom Cab (1915)
 Profit and the Loss (1917)
 Justice (1917)
 Tom Jones (1917)
 God and the Man (1918)
 Hindle Wakes (1918)
 Nelson (1918)
 The Toilers (1919)
 The Artistic Temperament (1919)
 Mr. Gilfil's Love Story (1920)
 The Twelve Pound Look (1920)
 Build Thy House (1920)
 Wuthering Heights (1920)
 The Will (1921)
 The Old Country (1921)
 Belphegor the Mountebank (1921)
 The Little Hour of Peter Wells (1921)
 The Prince and the Beggarmaid (1921)
 The Bachelor's Club (1921)
 The Adventures of Mr. Pickwick (1921)
 Her Penalty (1921)
 A Master of Craft (1922)
 Mord Em'ly (1922)
 The Pauper Millionaire (1922)
 A Sailor Tramp (1922)
 The Romany (1923)
 Heartstrings (1923)
 Paddy the Next Best Thing (1923)
 Hutch Stirs 'em Up (1923)
 The Fair Maid of Perth (1923)
 Becket (1924)
 The Loves of Colleen Bawn (1924)
 Hurricane Hutch in Many Adventures (1924)
 Wanted, a Boy (1924)
 The Gay Corinthian (1924)
 Love and Hate (1924)
 Chappy - That's All (1924)
 Settled Out of Court (1925)
 The Pleasure Garden (1925)
 The Mountain Eagle (1926), a lost film
 White Heat (1926)
 The Lodger: A Story of the London Fog (1927)
 Blighty (1927)
 Downhill (1927)
 Sailors Don't Care (1928)
 The Farmer's Wife (1928)
 Easy Virtue (1928)
 Tommy Atkins (1928)
 Champagne (1928)
 Not Quite a Lady (1928)
 The Vortex (1928)
 Young Woodley (1928)
 Widecombe Fair (1928)
 The Manxman (1929)
 The Hate Ship  (1929)
 The American Prisoner (1929)
 A Safe Affair (1931)
 The Officers' Mess (1931)
 Above Rubies (1932)
 To Brighton with Gladys (1933)

References

External links

Eliot Stannard biography at the British Film Institute's Screenonline

1888 births
1944 deaths
English male screenwriters
English film directors
20th-century English screenwriters
20th-century English male writers